Barry Lynn (born 18 March 1987) is a semi-professional former English darts player who plays in Professional Darts Corporation events and the Braintree Premier League.

He is most famous for his "dream run" in the 2016 UK Open, after having to qualify via the Riley's qualifiers, before reaching the quarter-finals. After early wins against Dean Stewart and Brett Claydon, he defeated former major finalist Brendan Dolan, before knocking out the reigning back-to-back world champion Gary Anderson in round 4 by a 9–3 scoreline. Then after defeating Stuart Kellett in round 5, he took on the world number one Michael van Gerwen in the quarter-finals, where he eventually lost 10–6.

He would later qualify for the 2016 BDO World Trophy, losing in the first round to Darius Labanauskas. He also won a PDC Challenge Tour title in 2016.

References

External links
Profile and stats on Darts Database

1987 births
Living people
English darts players
People from Braintree, Essex
Professional Darts Corporation associate players